Marcus Fabius Ambustus was a consular tribune of the Roman Republic in 381 BC, and a censor in 363.

He was the son of Caeso Fabius Ambustus, and the father of two daughters, the elder of whom married Servius Sulpicius Praetextatus, and the younger Gaius Licinius Stolo, one of the authors of the Lex Licinia Sextia.

The Fabii were patricians. The younger Fabia had married a plebeian, and according to Livy, persuaded her father to support the legislation that would open of the consulship to plebeians and hence her husband. As consular tribune a second time in 369, Ambustus took an active part in passing the Lex Licinia Sextia.

See also
 Ambustus, for other men with the same cognomen
 Fabius Ambustus, for other men who used the same combination of gens name and cognomen

References

4th-century BC Romans
Marcus Fabius Ambustus
Roman consular tribunes
Roman censors